, also known as The Depth of the Sky, is a Japanese manga series written by Mina Sakurai and illustrated by Marco Kohinata. It is based on Sakurai's novel of the same title, published in 2018. The manga was serialized in Shogakukan's seinen manga magazine Big Comic from March to May 2020, with its chapters collected in a single tankōbon volumes.

Publication
It is based on Sakurai novel of the same title, published by Futabasha on September 13, 2018. The series ran in Shogakukan's seinen manga magazine Big Comic from March 25 to May 9, 2020. Shogakukan collected its five chapters in a single tankōbon volume, released on August 28, 2020.

Reception
Hei no Naka no Biyōshitsu received an Excellence Award at the 24th Japan Media Arts Festival in 2021.

References

Further reading

External links
 

Prisons in anime and manga
Seinen manga
Shogakukan manga